Yeniçam can refer to:

 Yeniçam, Ayvacık
 Yeniçam, Buldan